Montello is an unincorporated community in Spring Township, Berks County, Pennsylvania, United States. It is located one mile south of Sinking Spring, and is less than half a mile from the South Heidelberg Township line. The village is served by the Wilson School District. Its Zip Code is 19608.

Unincorporated communities in Berks County, Pennsylvania
Unincorporated communities in Pennsylvania